Bhogi is the first day of the four-day Pongal Festival (பொங்கல் திருவிழா) Makar Sankranti (ಮಕರ ಸಂಕ್ರಾಂತಿ, మకర సంక్రాంతి) festival. It falls on last day of Agrahāyaṇa or Mārgaśīrṣa month of Hindu Solar Calendar. According to the Gregorian calendar, it is usually celebrated one day before Makar Sankranti(earlier 13 January, now on 14 January). It is a festival celebrated widely in Tamil Nadu, Andhra Pradesh, Telangana, Karnataka and Maharashtra. In Maharashtra, people eat roti made of Bajra sprinkled with til and mix vegetable gravy which includes palak, carrot, peas, green chana, papdi, etc.

On Bhogi, people discard old and derelict things and concentrate on new things causing change or transformation. At dawn, people light bonfires with logs of wood, other solid-fuels, and wooden furniture at home that are no longer useful. This marks the end of the year's accounts and the beginning of new accounts on the first day of the harvest on the following day. Like other festivals, Pongal and Lohri, Bhogi is also dedicated to Lord Indra Kaappu Kattu, an tradition of tying leaves of Azadirachta indica, Senna auriculata, Aerva lanata in the roofs of houses and residential areas is practiced in Kongu Nadu.

See also
 Pongal Festival
 List of Harvest Festivals

References

Harvest festivals in India
Agriculture in Andhra Pradesh
January observances
Festivals in Tamil Nadu
Folk festivals in India
Hindu festivals
Hindu festivals in Kerala